Gino Cavalieri (25 July 1895 – 15 October 1992) was an Italian film actor. He appeared in more than 20 films between 1937 and 1983.

Filmography

External links

1895 births
1992 deaths
Italian male film actors
20th-century Italian male actors